André Gasiglia (born 2 September 1885, date of death unknown), also known as Armand Gasiglia, was a French wrestler. He competed in the Greco-Roman heavyweight event at the 1920 Summer Olympics.

References

External links
 

1885 births
Year of death missing
Olympic wrestlers of France
Wrestlers at the 1920 Summer Olympics
French male sport wrestlers
Place of birth missing